McArthur-Council House is a historic home located near Grays Creek, Cumberland County, North Carolina. The earliest two room section was built about 1835, and was enlarged and modified between 1918 and 1920.  It is a two-story, Late Victorian style frame dwelling with a gable roof.  It features a double-tiered front porch.

It was listed on the National Register of Historic Places in 1983.

References

Houses on the National Register of Historic Places in North Carolina
Victorian architecture in North Carolina
Houses completed in 1835
Houses in Cumberland County, North Carolina
National Register of Historic Places in Cumberland County, North Carolina